Malakasi is a village and a former municipality in the Trikala regional unit, Thessaly, Greece. Since the 2011 local government reform it is part of the municipality Meteora, of which it is a municipal unit. The municipal unit has an area of 157.534 km2. Population 1,000 (2011). The seat of the municipality was in Panagia.

Municipal unit
The municipal unit of Malakasi includes the settlements of Korydallos, Malakasi, Panagia, Pefki and Trygona.

Geography
The village is part of the wider Zagori region, between Epirus and Thessaly.

History

The village takes its name from the Malakasii, an Albanian tribe or clan that moved to the area from central Albania in the 14th century. The name is of Vlach origin, and it means 'bad encampments'. It was named as such, probably because of the malaria which was the scourge of this area until the post-war period.

Ottoman period
During the Ottoman period, Epirus and Aetolia-Acarnania were divided into five armatolikia: Malakasi, Tzoumerka, Xeromero, Lidorikion, and Venetiko.

In May 1871, Malakasi was the seat of the Malakasi nahiye of the Ioannina kaza.

Demographics
The village is inhabited by "Vlachs" (Βλαχι), who are called Malakasi and inhabit the villages from Malakasi to Gardiki.

References

Bibliography

Zagori
Populated places in Trikala (regional unit)